Darkness Divided is the self-titled second and final studio album from the Christian metalcore band Darkness Divided. Victory Records released the album on April 22, 2016.

Background
Gerard Mora gave an interview to Outburn, where he was asked "How has being a Christian metalcore band helped or hurt, and are you trying to avoid that label this time around?", while his response was the following:

Critical reception

Tyler Davidson, giving the album a nine out of ten at Outburn, states, "On this self-titled album, San Antonio's Darkness Divided showcases a highly evolved, deeply matured metal sound not often heard, let alone on a sophomore album." Awarding the album four and a half stars from New Noise Magazine, Nicholas Senior writes, "It’s great to see a talented band truly capitalize on their potential with such a successful sophomore album." Chad Brown, reviewing the album at New-Transcendence, states, "Their newest self-titled release continues this impressive track record."

Track listing

Chart performance

References

2016 albums
Victory Records albums
Darkness Divided albums